The Magnificent Yankee is a 1950 American biographical film adapted by Emmet Lavery from his 1946 play of the same title, which was in turn adapted from the 1942 book Mr. Justice Holmes by Francis Biddle. The story examines the life of United States Supreme Court Justice Oliver Wendell Holmes Jr.

The film was directed by John Sturges, with stars Louis Calhern, Ann Harding, Eduard Franz, and Philip Ober. Calhern created the role of Oliver Wendell Holmes in the original Broadway production. Calhern was primarily a character actor in films and his portrayal of Holmes was his only true starring role in a sound film.  A grateful Metro-Goldwyn-Mayer purchased the film rights to the play specifically for Calhern in appreciation for his consistently fine work in many supporting roles during his years with the studio.

The film was nominated for Academy Awards for Best Actor in a Leading Role (Louis Calhern) and Best Costume Design, Black-and-White.

A Hallmark Hall of Fame television production of the same title was broadcast in 1965 starring Alfred Lunt and Lynn Fontanne.

Cast and characters
 Louis Calhern - Justice Oliver Wendell Holmes Jr.
 Ann Harding - Fanny Bowditch Holmes
 Philip Ober - Owen Wister
 Eduard Franz - Justice Louis Brandeis
 Ian Wolfe - Henry Adams
 Edith Evanson - Annie Gough
 Jimmy Lydon - Clinton
 Richard Anderson - Reynolds
 Herbert Anderson - Baxter
 Hayden Rorke - Graham (uncredited)
 Dan Tobin - Dixon (uncredited)

Release
The film was well received by critics. While produced on a relatively modest budget, the movie initially earned just $487,000 in the US and Canada and $76,000 elsewhere, resulting in a loss to MGM of $471,000.

Music
For his score for this film, David Raksin incorporated the songs "The Battle Hymn of the Republic", "Auld Lang Syne," and a portion of "A Nightingale Sang in Berkeley Square." Raksin also conducted the score.

The complete score was issued on CD in 2009, on Film Score Monthly records.

References

External links
 
 
 

1950 films
American black-and-white films
American courtroom films
Films directed by John Sturges
Films scored by David Raksin
Films based on American novels
American films based on plays
Metro-Goldwyn-Mayer films
Oliver Wendell Holmes Jr.
Films based on adaptations
Films set in the 1900s
American historical films
1950s historical films
1950s English-language films
1950s American films